Christopher Ryan (né Papazoglou; born 25 January 1950) is a British actor best known for his roles as Mike TheCoolPerson in the BBC comedy series The Young Ones, Dave Hedgehog in the BBC comedy series Bottom, Tony Driscoll in the BBC comedy series Only Fools and Horses, and as Edina Monsoon's ex-husband Marshall Turtle in the BBC sitcom Absolutely Fabulous. He has also appeared as the McKendrick twins in One Foot in the Grave, and played Sontaran General Staal in Doctor Who in 2008.

Early life
Ryan was born Christopher Papazoglou in Bayswater, London to an English mother and a Greek father. He trained at East 15 Acting School from 1968 to 1971, then began his professional acting career with Glasgow Citizens' Theatre.

Career

The Young Ones
Ryan was the only Young Ones cast member who was not already well known in British comedy circles, the other principal parts being taken by The Comic Strip members Rik Mayall, Adrian Edmondson, Nigel Planer, and Alexei Sayle. He was a last-minute replacement for Peter Richardson, for whom the "straight man" role of "Mike TheCoolPerson" was originally intended.

In 1986, Ryan reunited with the rest of the cast for the comedic charity single and music video for Cliff Richard's hit song "Living Doll", with Richard himself, for Comic Relief.

Later career
In 1987, he starred in the short-lived BBC sitcom A Small Problem. He played Lucky in Samuel Beckett's Waiting for Godot at the Queen's Theatre in the West End in 1991, alongside Mayall and Edmondson. He later played Dave Hedgehog in Bottom, and Marshall Turtle, one of Edina's unloved ex-husbands, on Absolutely Fabulous. He has also appeared in two major sitcoms: he played one of the Driscoll brothers in an episode of Only Fools And Horses and spin-off The Green Green Grass, a pair of identical twin builders in the One Foot in the Grave episode "Hole in the Sky", and a plumber in the episode "The Valley of Fear". He appeared in Back to School Mr. Bean, My Family and Saxondale. He joined up again with Jennifer Saunders for two episodes of The Life and Times of Vivienne Vyle.

In 1986, he appeared in the science fiction series Doctor Who as the alien creature Lord Kiv in the serial The Trial of a Time Lord: Mindwarp, and as one of the rose-painting playing cards in the 1999 TV version of Alice in Wonderland. In 2008, he again guest-starred in Doctor Who in the episodes "The Sontaran Stratagem" and "The Poison Sky", as the Sontaran leader "General Staal", and in the 2010 episode "The Pandorica Opens", playing another Sontaran character, "Commander Stark". In 2012 he appeared in the role of Marshall in Episode 3 "Olympics" of the Absolutely Fabulous 20th-anniversary specials.

Although his film appearances were few, he played small roles in Santa Claus: The Movie (1985) and the film Dirty Weekend (1993), directed by Michael Winner.

Ryan starred as Baron Hardup in the pantomime of Cinderella at the Theatre Royal, Norwich from 17 December 2013 to 19 January 2014.

Filmography

Film

Television

Audio drama

Video games

Music videos

Theatre

References

External links
 
 

1950 births
Living people
Alumni of East 15 Acting School
English male film actors
English male stage actors
English male television actors
English people of Greek descent
Male actors from London
The Flying Pickets members
20th-century English male actors
21st-century English male actors